Costanza Ferro (born 5 July 1993) is an Italian synchronized swimmer. She competed in the women's duet at the 2016 Summer Olympics. and Duet at the 2020 Summer Olympics. 

Ferro is an athlete of the Gruppo Sportivo della Marina Militare,

References

External links
 
 
 
 

1993 births
Living people
Italian synchronized swimmers
Olympic synchronized swimmers of Italy
Synchronized swimmers at the 2016 Summer Olympics
Synchronized swimmers at the 2020 Summer Olympics
World Aquatics Championships medalists in synchronised swimming
Synchronized swimmers at the 2017 World Aquatics Championships
Artistic swimmers at the 2019 World Aquatics Championships
Universiade medalists in synchronized swimming
Universiade bronze medalists for Italy
European Aquatics Championships medalists in synchronised swimming
European Championships (multi-sport event) bronze medalists
Sportspeople from Genoa
Artistic swimmers of Marina Militare
Medalists at the 2013 Summer Universiade
Artistic swimmers at the 2022 World Aquatics Championships